Anton Petrov (born 11 March 1985) is a former Bulgarian footballer, who played as a defender.

References

External links 
 

1985 births
Living people
Bulgarian footballers
First Professional Football League (Bulgaria) players
OFC Vihren Sandanski players
PFC Spartak Pleven players
FC Chavdar Etropole players
PFC Kaliakra Kavarna players
FC Botev Vratsa players
FC Vitosha Bistritsa players
Association football defenders